Genista  is a genus of flowering plants in the legume family Fabaceae, native to open habitats such as moorland and pasture in Europe and western Asia. They include species commonly called broom, though the term may also refer to other genera, including Cytisus and Chamaecytisus. Brooms in other genera are sometimes considered synonymous with Genista: Echinospartum, Retama, Spartium, Stauracanthus, and Ulex.

Description
They are mainly deciduous shrubs and trees, often with brush-like foliage, often spiny to deter grazing, and masses of small, pea-like yellow blooms which are sometimes fragrant.  Many of the species have flowers that open explosively when alighted on by an insect, the style flying through the upper seam of the keel and striking the underside of the insect, followed by a shower of pollen that coats the insect.

The name of the Plantagenet royal line, which reigned in England from 1154 to 1485, is derived from this genus, being a dialectal variation of planta genista.

Several species are widely cultivated for their often sweet-smelling, abundant blooms early in the season, though many are not fully hardy. The cultivar 'Porlock' has received the Royal Horticultural Society's Award of Garden Merit.

Species
Genista comprises the following species:
 Genista abchasica Sachokia
 Genista acanthoclada DC.

 Genista aetnensis (Biv.) DC.—Mount Etna broom

 Genista albida Willd.

 Genista anatolica Boiss.

 Genista anglica L.—petty whin, needle furze

 Genista angustifolia Schischkin

 Genista arbusensis Vals.
 Genista aristata C. Presl
 Genista armeniaca Spach
 Genista aspalathoides Lam.
 Genista aucheri Boiss.
 Genista ausetana (O. Bolòs & Vigo) Talavera

 Genista balearica Porta & Rigo
 Genista banatica (Simonk.) Holub

 Genista berberidea Lange

 Genista burdurensis P.E. Gibbs
 

 Genista cadasonensis Vals.

 Genista canariensis L.

 Genista capitellata Coss.
 Genista carinalis Griseb.
 Genista carpetana Lange
 Genista cephalantha Spach
 Genista cinerascens Lange
 Genista cinerea (Vill.) DC.
 Genista clavata Poir.
 Genista compacta Schischkin
 Genista corsica (Loisel.) DC.

 Genista cupanii Guss.
 

 Genista depressa M. Bieb.

 Genista desoleana Vals.

 Genista dorycnifolia Font Quer

 Genista ephedroides DC.

 Genista falcata Brot.
 Genista fasselata Decne.
 Genista ferox Poir.
 Genista flagellaris Sommier & Levier
 Genista florida L.
 Genista fukarekiana Micevski & E. Mey.
 Genista gasparrinii (Guss.) C. Presl

 Genista germanica L.

 Genista haenseleri Boiss.
 Genista halacsyi Heldr.
 Genista hassertiana (Bald.) Buchegger

 
 Genista hillebrandtii H. Christ
 Genista hirsuta M. Vahl
 Genista hispanica L.
 Genista holopetala (Koch) Bald.

 Genista humifusa L.

 Genista hystrix Lange
 Genista ifniensis Caball.
 Genista involucrata Spach
 Genista januensis Viv.
 subsp. januensis Viv.
 subsp. lydia (Boiss.) Kit Tan & Ziel.

 Genista juzepczukii Tzvelev
 Genista kolakowskyi Sachokia

 Genista libanotica Boiss.
 Genista linifolia L.—flax broom

 Genista lobelii DC.

 Genista lucida Cambess.

 Genista maderensis (Webb & Berthel.) Lowe
 Genista majorica Canto & M.J. Sanchez

 Genista melia Boiss.
 Genista michelii Spach
 Genista micrantha Ortega
 Genista microcephala Coss. & Durieu
 Genista microphylla DC.
 Genista millii Boiss.
 Genista mingrelica Albov

 Genista monspessulana (L.) L.A.S. Johnson—French broom, cape broom, Montpellier broom
 Genista morisii Colla
 Genista mugronensis Vierh.

 Genista nevadensis (Esteve & Vara) Rivas Mart., Asensi, Molero Mesa & F. Valle
 Genista nissana Petrovic

 Genista numidica Spach
 Genista obtusiramea Spach

 Genista osmariensis Coss.

 Genista oxycedrina Pomel
 Genista paivae Lowe
 Genista parnassica Halacsy

 Genista pilosa L.
 Genista polyanthos Willk.

 Genista pseudopilosa Coss.

 Genista pulchella Vis.

 Genista quadriflora Munby
 Genista radiata (L.) Scop.

 Genista ramosissima (Desf.) Poir.

 

 Genista sagittalis L.

 Genista sakellariadis Boiss. & Orph.
 Genista salzmannii DC.
 Genista sanabrensis Valdes Brem. & al.
 Genista sandrasica Hartvig & Strid
 Genista sardoa Vals.

 Genista scorpius (L.) DC.—aulaga
 Genista scythica Pacz.
 Genista segonnei (Maire) P.E. Gibbs
 Genista sericea Wulfen
 Genista sessilifolia DC.

 Genista sibirica L.
 Genista spachiana Webb
 Genista spartioides Spach

 Genista spinulosa Pomel
 Genista splendens Webb & Berthel.
 Genista stenopetala Webb & Berthel.—sweet broom, Easter broom

 Genista suanica Schischkin
 Genista subcapitata Pancic
 Genista sulcitana Vals.

 Genista sylvestris Scop.
 var. pungens (Vis.) Rehder
 var. sylvestris Scop.

 Genista taurica Dubovik
 Genista tejedensis (Porto & Rigo) C. Vicioso
 Genista tenera (Murray) Kuntze

 Genista teretifolia Willk.
 Genista tetragona Besser
 Genista thyrrena Vals.
 Genista tinctoria L.—dyer's broom, woodwaxen
 var. ovata (Waldst. & Kit.) F. W. Schultz
 var. tinctoria L.
 Genista toluensis Vals.
 Genista tournefortii Spach
 Genista transcaucasica Schischkin
 Genista triacanthos Brot.

 Genista tricuspidata Desf.
 Genista tridens (Cav.) DC.
 Genista tridentata L.

 Genista ulicina Spach
 Genista umbellata (L'Hér.) Poir.
 Genista valentina (Spreng.) Steud.

 Genista verae Juz.
 Genista versicolor Boiss.

Species names with uncertain taxonomic status
The status of the following species is unresolved:

 Genista abyssinica Briq.
 Genista acquinoctialis Briq.
 Genista acutiflora Pau
 Genista acutifolia Spach
 Genista aegyptiaca Spreng.
 Genista aequinoctialis Briq.
 Genista affghanica Briq.
 Genista africana Briq.
 Genista albanica F.K.Mey.
 Genista alpicola Schur
 Genista alpina (Mill.) Spach
 Genista amana Rech.f.
 Genista amarella Lepech.
 Genista americana Spach
 Genista anabaptizata Briq.
 Genista andreana Puiss.
 Genista apetala Spach
 Genista aphylla DC.
 Genista aprutia C.Presl
 Genista arabica (Decne.) Briq.
 Genista arborea Spreng.
 Genista arborea Rouy
 Genista arborescens Mill. ex Spach
 Genista arcuata W.D.J.Koch
 Genista argentea (L.) Noulet
 Genista armata Poir.
 Genista artwinensis Schischk.
 Genista ascendens Briq.
 Genista austriaca (L.) Scheele
 Genista bakeri Briq.
 Genista bakeria Briq.
 Genista balansae (Boiss.) Rouy
 Genista ballii Briq.
 Genista barbara Munby
 Genista benehoavensis (Bolle) del Arco
 Genista bisflorens (Host) Rouy
 Genista bivonae C.Presl
 Genista bocchierii Bacch., Brullo & Feoli Chiapella
 Genista bourgaei Spach ex Nyman
 Genista bracteolata Link
 Genista britannica Rchb.
 Genista brugnieri Spach
 Genista brutia Brullo, Scelsi & Spamp.
 Genista caballeroi Pau ex Caball.
 Genista caespitosa K.Koch
 Genista calcicola Schur
 Genista calycina Briq.
 Genista capensis Spach
 Genista cappadocica Spach
 Genista cassia Boiss.
 Genista catalaunica (Webb) Rouy
 Genista cazorlana Debeaux & E.Rev.
 Genista charegia Coss. ex Batt.
 Genista cilentina Vals.
 Genista cineria DC.
 Genista cirtensis Pomel
 Genista collina Briq.
 Genista commixta Spach
 Genista compressa Sol. ex A.Cunn.
 Genista congesta (Willd.) Poir.
 Genista connata Briq.
 Genista contaminata Poir.
 Genista cordifolia Porta
 Genista coriacea Kit.
 Genista cosoniaca Bernardin ex Gand.
 Genista cossoniana Batt.
 Genista cotinifolia Burm.f.
 Genista crassifolia Briq.
 Genista crebrispina Pomel
 Genista cretica (L.) Spach
 Genista crotalarioides Briq.
 Genista csikii Kümmerle & Jáv.
 Genista cupani Guss.
 Genista cuspidata (Cav.) Spach
 Genista cuspidosa DC.
 Genista cytisoides Spach
 Genista dasycarpa Ball
 Genista daurica G.Nicholson
 Genista defoliata Lam.
 Genista delarbrei Lecoq & Lamotte
 Genista demarcoi Brullo, Scelsi & Siracusa
 Genista densa Poir.
 Genista discolor Webb ex Lowe
 Genista disperma Spach
 Genista divaricata Link
 Genista dorycnioides Briq.
 Genista dumetorum G.Nicholson
 Genista duriaei Spach
 Genista echinata Sennen
 Genista eckloniana Briq.
 Genista elias-sennenii Uribe-Ech. & Urrutia
 Genista elliptica (Willd. ex Spreng.) Steud.
 Genista elliptica Kit.
 Genista elongata Scheele
 Genista elongata (Waldst. & Kit.) E.H.L.Krause
 Genista emirnensis Briq.
 Genista ephedrifolia Pourr. ex Willk. & Lange
 Genista ericetorum Hoffmanns. ex Spreng.
 Genista erinacea Gilib.
 Genista erinaceoides (Loisel.) Vierh.
 Genista eriocarpa Kunze
 Genista europaea E.H.L.Krause
 Genista exaltata Link ex DC.
 Genista filifolia Licht. ex Walp.
 Genista filiformis Briq.
 Genista flaccida Briq.
 Genista foliolosa Link
 Genista formosa Carrière
 Genista fragrans Spach
 Genista friedrichsthaliana C.Presl
 Genista fritschii Rech.
 Genista frutescens Schloss. & Vuk.
 Genista gaditana Rouy
 Genista galioides Spach
 Genista gasparini C. Presl
 Genista genuensis Pers.
 Genista glabra Spach
 Genista gracilis Poir.
 Genista gracilis Spach
 Genista grandiflora (DC.) Spach
 Genista grossii Font Quer
 Genista gymnoptera Duby ex Nyman
 Genista halleri Reyn. ex DC.
 Genista harveyi Briq.
 Genista herbacea Lam.
 Genista hillebrandii Christ
 Genista hirta Rouy
 Genista hybrida E.H.L. Krause
 Genista hypericifolia Herb. ex Colla
 Genista incana Briq.
 Genista incerta Friv. ex Griseb.
 Genista incubacea Schur
 Genista inermis Gilib.
 Genista inermis Pančić
 Genista infesta G.Don
 Genista inops Boiss. & Balansa
 Genista insularis Bacch., Brullo & Feoli Chiapella
 Genista interrupta (Cav.) Steud.
 Genista italica Lodd. ex G.Don
 Genista jacquiniana Scheele
 Genista jaubertii Spach
 Genista jimenezii Pau ex Munuera
 Genista jordani Shuttlew. ex Rouy & Fouc.
 Genista jordanii Shuttlew.
 Genista juasi Buch.-Ham. ex D.Don
 Genista juncea Scop.
 Genista kabylica Coss. ex Batt.
 Genista kochii Rouy
 Genista kotschyi Briq.
 Genista laburnum (L.) E.H.L.Krause
 Genista lampropphylla Spach
 Genista lanigera Spach
 Genista laricifolia Burm.f.
 Genista leptophylla Spach
 Genista lipskii (Novopokr. & Schischk.) Novopokr. & Schischk.
 Genista longirostrata Sennen
 Genista lunaris Briq.
 Genista macrobotrys (Maire & Sennen) Sennen
 Genista madoniensis Raimondo
 Genista maroccana Briq.
 Genista martinii Verguin & Soulie
 Genista mauritiana Pau & Sennen
 Genista microsoma Briq.
 Genista millani Caball.
 Genista milli Heldr. ex Boiss.
 Genista minima Bubani
 Genista minor Lam.
 Genista minor Guillon ex Verl.
 Genista moesiaca Velen.
 Genista mogadorensis Pau
 Genista moleroi Talavera & P.E.Gibbs
 Genista mollis (Cav.) DC.
 Genista montbretii Spach
 Genista multibracteata Tausch
 Genista multicaulis Lam.
 Genista myrtifolia Burm.f.
 Genista nervata Hoppe ex Griseb.
 Genista nigricans (L.) Scheele ex Briq.
 Genista nigricans (L.) E.H.L.Krause
 Genista nitens (Willd.) Steud.
 Genista nitida Formánek
 Genista nodosa Tausch
 Genista notarisii Rouy
 Genista nubigena Link
 Genista nuda (Willd.) Steud.
 Genista obsoleta (Eckl. & Zeyh.) Briq.
 Genista odorata Moench
 Genista odoratissima Spach
 Genista odoratissima Pourr.
 Genista oliverii Spach
 Genista orientalis Spach
 Genista ornithopodioides (Jaub. & Spach) Briq.
 Genista ottomanica Formánek
 Genista ovina Bacch., Brullo & Feoli Chiapella
 Genista palmatiformis Maire & Sennen, in Sennen
 Genista palmiformis (Sennen & Mauricio ex Maire) Maire & Sennen
 Genista parviflora Brot.
 Genista parvifolia G.Don
 Genista pauciflorum Briq.
 Genista pedunculata L'Hér.
 Genista peloponnesiaca Spach
 Genista pendulina Lam.
 Genista persica Poir.
 Genista pestalozzae Boiss.
 Genista petitiana (A.Rich.) Briq.
 Genista philippi Lindl.
 Genista phrygia Bornm.
 Genista pichisermolliana Vals.
 Genista pilocarpa Link
 Genista pinastrifolia Spach
 Genista polygalaefolia DC.
 Genista polygalaephylla Brot.
 Genista polyphylla (Eckl. & Zeyh.) Briq.
 Genista polysperma Briq.
 Genista polytricha Spach
 Genista pomeli Mares & Vigineix
 Genista pomeliana Maire
 Genista pomelii Marès & Vigin.
 Genista postranensis Formánek
 Genista pratensis Pollini
 Genista pseudoumbellata Caball.
 Genista pteroclada (Boiss.) Spach
 Genista pulverulenta Fisch. & C.A.Mey.
 Genista pungens Poir.
 Genista purpurea (Scop.) E.H.L.Krause
 Genista ramentacea (Sieber) Briq.
 Genista ratisbonensis (Schaeff.) E.H.L.Krause
 Genista raymundi Maire & Sennen, in Sennen & Mauricio
 Genista retama G.Nicholson
 Genista rhodophon Webb ex Delile
 Genista rhodorhizoides Webb & Berthel.
 Genista richteri Rouy
 Genista rigens C.Presl
 Genista rosea (Jaub. & Spach) Briq.
 Genista rostrata Poir.
 Genista salditana Pomel
 Genista salesii Sennen
 Genista salicifolia Dippel
 Genista sauzeana (Burnham & Briq.) Rouy
 Genista schimperiana (Hochst.) Briq.
 Genista scolopendria Spach
 Genista scolopendrina Willk.
 Genista scoparia (L.) Lam.
 Genista scoparia Chaix
 Genista scopolii Rouy
 Genista scorpia St.-Lag.
 Genista scorpionia St.-Lag.
 Genista sennenii Font Quer ex Sennen
 Genista sepiaria Lam.
 Genista sessiliflora Briq.
 Genista sigeriana Fuss
 Genista silana Brullo, Gangale & Spamp.
 Genista sophoroides Spach
 Genista spathulata Spach
 Genista sphaerocarpa (L.) Lam.
 Genista spicata Eckl. & Zeyh. ex Meisn.
 Genista spiniflora Lam.
 Genista stenocarpa Janka
 Genista stenophylla Schur
 Genista stipulacea (Eckl. & Zeyh.) Briq.
 Genista stylosa (Spreng.) G.Don
 Genista subsecunda Schur
 Genista subsericans (Bornm.) Rech.f.
 Genista supranubia (L.f.) Spach
 Genista syriaca (Boiss. & Blanche) Boiss. & Blanche
 Genista tamarrutii Caball.
 Genista tchihatchewi Boiss.
 Genista tenella Willk.
 Genista tenorei G.Don
 Genista tenorii Steud.
 Genista tenorii G. Don
 Genista tenuispina Samp.
 Genista thebaica Spach
 Genista thyrsiflora G.Nicholson
 Genista tomentella Boiss. & Noë
 Genista tomentosa Poir.
 Genista transsilvanica Schur
 Genista trigonelloides (Jaub. & Spach) Briq.
 Genista tripolitana Bornm.
 Genista triquetra (Lam.) L'Hér.
 Genista triquetra Willd.
 Genista triquetra Waldst. & Kit.
 Genista tyrrhena Vals.
 Genista undulata Link
 Genista uniflora (Decne.) Briq.
 Genista valdes-bermejoi Talavera & L.Sáez
 Genista valsecchiae Brullo & De Marco
 Genista velutina (Eckl. & Zeyh.) Briq.
 Genista versiflora Tausch
 Genista villosa Lam.
 Genista villosa Spach
 Genista vulgaris Garsault
 Genista vulgaris Gray
 Genista vuralii A.Duran & Dural
 Genista walpersiana Briq.
 Genista weldeniana Scheele
 Genista zeyheri Briq.

Hybrids
The following hybrids have been described:
 
 Genista ×altoportillensis Egido & Puente García
 Genista ×arizagae Elorza et al.
 Genista ×fritschii Rech.
 Genista ×martinii Verg. & Soulié
 Genista ×norpalentina J.M.Aparicio et al.
 Genista ×oweniana auct.
 Genista ×rivasgodayana J.Andrés & Llamas
 Genista ×segurae Uribe-Ech. & Urrutia
 Genista ×uribe-echebarriae Urrutia

References

 
Fabaceae genera
Taxa named by Carl Linnaeus